Fitzroy is a former incorporated and present day geographic township originally part of Carleton County in eastern Ontario, Canada.

Fitzroy was located in the western part of the county, bordered to the northeast by Torbolton Township, to the southeast by Huntley Township, to the southwest by Pakenham Township and to the northwest by the Ottawa River.

The township was established in 1823. The first permanent settler is believed to have been Charles Shirreff around 1818. Shirreff founded the settlement of Fitzroy Harbour in 1831. The township was an important centre of the timber trade during the 19th century. In 1974, the township  was amalgamated with Huntley and Torbolton to form West Carleton. In 2001, West Carleton became part of the new city of Ottawa.

Fitzroy took its name from Sir Charles Augustus FitzRoy, son-in-law to
Charles Lennox, 4th Duke of Richmond who was Governor General of British North America from 1818 to 1819.

According to the Canada 2016 Census, the Township had a population of 4,413. As of the Canada 2021 Census, this had increased to 4,616.

Villages within the township included:
 Fitzroy Harbour
 Galetta
 Kinburn
 Antrim

Reeves 
1850 J. Steen
1857 T. Elliott
1862 William Dean
1863 John Neil
1865 James Hubbell
1866 William Dean
1867 John Neil
1868 Allen Fraser
1872 John Neil
1878 Allan Fraser
1880 David MacLaren
1882 Charles Mohr
1896 A.E. Riddell
1897 n/a
1907 F.S. McClure
1909 Charles Mohr
1912 W. Boyle
1916 J.C. Greene
1918 T.B. Wilson
1922 R.G. Tripp
1929 John Shannon
1935 Stuart Craig
1940 V.E. Major
1959 Harvey E. Craig
1965 Hiram Wilson
1973 Jack Shaw

See also
List of townships in Ontario

References

Further reading
Ottawa Branch, Ontario Genealogical Society, Ten Fitzroy Township Cemeteries - Burial Records , (Ottawa, Ontario, Global Heritage Press, 2017).

Ottawa Branch, Ontario Genealogical Society, Three Fitzroy Township Cemeteries - Burial Records  , (Ottawa, Ontario, Global Heritage Press, 2017).

Former municipalities now in Ottawa
Geographic townships in Ontario
Populated places disestablished in 1974